Karl-Heinz Riedle (born 16 September 1965) is a German former professional footballer who played as a striker.

Despite not being particularly tall, he was nicknamed "Air" throughout his career, due to his notable heading accuracy, jumping and timing skills in the air, as well as his ability to make runs into the box and get on the end of crosses, and made a name for himself as a traditional yet well-rounded and prolific centre forward. He appeared in 207 Bundesliga games over the course of eight seasons, scoring 62 of his 72 goals for Werder Bremen and Borussia Dortmund. He also played for Lazio in Italy and Liverpool in England.

A German international for six years, Riedle represented the country in two World Cups – winning the 1990 edition – and Euro 1992.

Club career

Germany
Born in Weiler im Allgäu, Swabia, Riedle started his senior career in the Bayernliga with FC Augsburg, being club top scorer in the 1985–86 season with a total of 20 goals. His performances attracted interest from newly promoted Bundesliga side SpVgg Blau-Weiß 1890 Berlin, who signed him for a fee of 33,000 Deutsche Mark; he made his league debut for his new team on 9 August 1986, scoring in a 4–1 home loss against 1. FC Kaiserslautern.

After his team's relegation, as last, Riedle nonetheless signed with SV Werder Bremen, led by legendary Otto Rehhagel, and netted 18 times in his first season (second-best in the league behind Jürgen Klinsmann, and 24 overall) to help the club win the national title. During his three-year spell with the Hanseatic he scored 58 goals all competitions comprised, and appeared in back-to-back German Cup finals, losing both and finding the net in the 1989 edition – opening the score in a 4–1 defeat to Borussia Dortmund.

Lazio and return home
In the 1990 summer, Riedle moved to S.S. Lazio of Italy for a transfer fee of 13 million DM. During his stint with the Roman the club failed to win any silverware or reach any final, and his best output occurred in the 1991–92 campaign when he scored 13 goals in 29 games for an eventual 10th-place finish in Serie A; for two of his three years, he shared teams with countryman Thomas Doll.

Riedle returned to Germany in 1993 and joined Borussia Dortmund. He was a starter for most of his spell, often partnering Stéphane Chapuisat, but failed to reproduce his previous form, never scoring in double digits; he was however important in the conquest of the 1995 and 1996 national championships (13 goals combined) and, in the 1996–97 UEFA Champions League, netted twice against Juventus in the final for a 3–1 success.

England
In 1997, Riedle joined Liverpool in the Premier League. He was irregularly used during his stint at Anfield, especially after the phasing-in of 18-year-old Michael Owen.

In late September 1999, 34-year-old Riedle moved to Fulham where, along with his old Liverpool manager Roy Evans, he would serve as caretaker manager until the end of 1999–2000 after Paul Bracewell's dismissal. Before the end of the following season – where he eventually netted once from 14 appearances to help Fulham to top flight promotion – he announced his retirement.

International career
Riedle made his debut for West Germany on 31 August 1988, playing 15 minutes against Finland and scoring in a 4–0 away win for the 1990 World Cup qualifiers. Selected by coach Franz Beckenbauer for the finals in Italy as a backup to Klinsmann and Rudi Völler, he contributed with four games as the national team won its third title, starting once due to suspension to the latter. In the semi-final against England Völler limped off injured in the first half and Riedle came on as a substitute. The match went to penalties and Riedle converted his attempt as Germany eventually prevailed. However Völler recovered to start the final and Riedle remained on the bench.

One of Riedle's most memorable matches for Germany came during the UEFA Euro 1992 semi-final against Sweden, in which he netted two goals in a 3–2 triumph, eventually being the tournament's joint-top scorer. He gained a total of 42 caps, scoring on 16 occasions.

Personal life
Riedle married Gabriele and fathered three children, Alessandro, who is also a professional footballer, Dominic and Vivien-Joana. He owned a hotel and ran a football academy, in the village of Oberstaufen.

On 28 August 2014, UEFA announced Riedle as the ambassador of the upcoming Champions League final, which was later held in Berlin.

Career statistics

Club

International

Honours
Werder Bremen
Bundesliga: 1987–88
DFL-Supercup: 1988
DFB-Pokal runner-up: 1988–89, 1989–90

Borussia Dortmund
UEFA Champions League: 1996–97
Bundesliga: 1994–95, 1995–96
DFL-Supercup: 1995, 1996

Fulham
Football League Championship: 2000–01

Germany
FIFA World Cup: 1990
UEFA European Championship: Runner-up 1992
Summer Olympic Games: Bronze medal 1988
US Cup: 1993

Individual
UEFA Cup Top Scorer: 1989–90 (joint)
UEFA European Championship: Top Scorer 1992 (joint)

References

External links

Liverpool historic profile

1965 births
Living people
People from Lindau (district)
Sportspeople from Swabia (Bavaria)
German footballers
Footballers from Bavaria
Association football forwards
Bundesliga players
FC Augsburg players
Blau-Weiß 1890 Berlin players
SV Werder Bremen players
Borussia Dortmund players
Serie A players
S.S. Lazio players
Premier League players
Liverpool F.C. players
Fulham F.C. players
Germany under-21 international footballers
Germany international footballers
1990 FIFA World Cup players
1994 FIFA World Cup players
UEFA Euro 1992 players
FIFA World Cup-winning players
Olympic footballers of West Germany
Footballers at the 1988 Summer Olympics
Olympic medalists in football
Medalists at the 1988 Summer Olympics
Olympic bronze medalists for West Germany
German expatriate footballers
Expatriate footballers in Italy
Expatriate footballers in England
German expatriate sportspeople in Italy
German expatriate sportspeople in England
German football managers
Fulham F.C. managers
Expatriate football managers in England
German expatriate football managers
UEFA Champions League winning players
Borussia Dortmund non-playing staff
West German footballers